Snow Queen may refer to:
 The Snow Queen, an 1845 fairy tale by Hans Christian Andersen
 Snow queen or Synthyris reniformis, a species of flowering plant

Adaptations of the Andersen fairy tale

Film
 The Snow Queen (1957 film), USSR animation
 The Snow Queen (1967 film), USSR  fantasy 
 The Snow Queen (1986 film), Finland
 The Snow Queen (1995 film), UK animation
 Snow Queen (2002 film), US fantasy
 The Snow Queen (2005 film), BBC TV
 The Snow Queen (2012 film), Russian animation

Television
 The Snow Queen (Japanese TV series), Japan, 2005
 The Snow Queen (South Korean TV series), South Korea, 2006
 "The Snow Queen" (Faerie Tale Theatre), a 1985 episode
 "The Snow Queen" (Once Upon a Time), a 2014 episode

Other adaptations
 The Snow Queen (Vinge novel), a 1980 science fiction novel by Joan D. Vinge
 The Snow Queen (Lackey novel), a 2008 novel by Mercedes Lackey
 The Snow Queen (opera), a 1992 chamber opera
 The Snow Queen (Abrahamsen), a 2019 opera
 The Snow Queen (video game), 1985
 Die Schneekönigin, 2015 opera by George Alexander Albrecht

Other uses
 Snow Queen Trophy, a slalom race of the Alpine skiing World Cup held in Zagreb, Croatia
 Kylie Christmas: Snow Queen Edition, a Christmas album by Kylie Minogue
 Snow Queen (album), an album by Sofia Rotaru
 "Snow Queen," B-side of Elton John's "Don't Go Breaking My Heart"
 "Snow Queen," B-side of Roger Nichols Trio, Love Song, Love Song (1967)
 Snow Queen, a role in the ballet The Nutcracker 
 Snow queen (slang), a gay black or Hispanic man who prefers Caucasian men

See also
 Elsa (Frozen), a fictional character in the Frozen franchise
 White Witch, a fictional character in the novel series The Chronicles of Narnia
 Ice Queen (disambiguation)